Xinhua is an official news agency of the People's Republic of China.

Xinhua may also refer to:

 "New China"    :
 Republic of China (1912–1949) (rarely used), as opposed to Imperial China prior to the Xinhai Revolution
 People's Republic of China, as opposed to the Imperial and Nationalist China prior to the success of the Chinese Communist Revolution, which is typically referred to as "Old China"
 The present Republic of China on Taiwan

Places

Mainland China
 Xinhua, Linze County, Gansu
 Xinhua, Hegang, in Dongshan District, Hegang, Heilongjiang
 Xinhua, Shennongjia, Hubei
 Xinhua, Tongyu County, Jilin
 Xinhua, Xuanhan County, Sichuan
 Xinhua, Wenshan, in Funing County, Yunnan
 Xinhua County, Loudi, Hunan
 Xinhua District (disambiguation)
 Xinhua Gate, a main gate of Zhongnanhai in Beijing
 Xinhua Town, Bayannur, in Linhe District, Bayannur, Inner Mongolia
 Xinhua Subdistrict (disambiguation)
 Xinhua Township (disambiguation)

Taiwan
 Xinhua District, Tainan

Others
 China Xinhua Airlines, based in Beijing
 China Xinhua News Network Corporation, a TV news channel owned by the Xinhua News Agency
 Xinhua Bookstore, a major bookstore chain in China
 Xinhua Daily, a newspaper in Jiangsu province
 Xinhua Film Company, a Shanghai film company active in the 1930s and 40s
 Xinhua Holdings, a financial news company based in Hong Kong
 Xinhua Sports & Entertainment, a media group based in Beijing, subsidiary of Xinhua Holdings
 Xinhua Zidian, a Chinese language dictionary
 SS Xinhua, a former Chinese merchant ship
 Xin Hua (software)
 Sin Hua Bank (Xinhua Bank)

See also
 Xinghua (disambiguation)